Mehmet Muş (born 1 May 1982) is a Turkish politician and economist, who is a Deputy in the Turkish Parliament for Istanbul. He has also served as the Turkish Minister of Trade since 2021.

References 

Living people
1982 births

Ministers of Trade of Turkey
People from Trabzon
Eastern Mediterranean University alumni
Turkish expatriates in Northern Cyprus
Justice and Development Party (Turkey) politicians
Members of the Grand National Assembly of Turkey